Zechariah 4 is the fourth of the total 14 chapters in the Book of Zechariah in the Hebrew Bible or the Old Testament of the Christian Bible. This book contains the prophecies attributed to the prophet Zechariah, and is a part of the Book of the Twelve Minor Prophets. This chapter is a part of a section (so-called "First Zechariah") consisting of Zechariah 1–8.

Text 
The original text was written in the Hebrew language. This chapter is divided into 14 verses.

Textual witnesses
Some early manuscripts containing the text of this chapter in Hebrew are of the Masoretic Text, which includes the Codex Cairensis (from year 895), the Petersburg Codex of the Prophets (916), and Codex Leningradensis (1008).

Fragments containing parts of this chapter were found among the Dead Sea Scrolls, that is, 4Q80 (4QXIIe; 75–50 BCE) with extant verses 1–4.

There is also a translation into Koine Greek known as the Septuagint, made in the last few centuries BCE. Extant ancient manuscripts of the Septuagint version include Codex Vaticanus (B; B; 4th century), Codex Sinaiticus (S; BHK: S; 4th century), Codex Alexandrinus (A; A; 5th century) and Codex Marchalianus (Q; Q; 6th century).

Vision of the lampstand and olive trees (4:1–6)
The fifth of the eight visions uses the 'seal imagery' of the golden lamp and the olive-tree to symbolize joint leaders to do the works for God: Joshua the high priest and the Davidic
governor Zerubbabel.

Verse 6
 So he answered and said to me:
“This is the word of the Lord to Zerubbabel:
‘Not by might nor by power, but by My Spirit,’
Says the Lord of hosts."

 "Not by might": Zerubabbel's work will be accomplished through the grace of God alone. Septuagint: "not by great might;" but the Vulgate renders it: "not by an army." Zerubbabel might feel dispirited thinking how much there was to do with so few at his disposal, and how formidable the opposition, so this message reassure him of the promise of Divine aid, knowing that God regards him precious as a servant of the Lord, and governor of Judah (Haggai 1:1).
 "But by my Spirit": the work is to be effected by the living Spirit (cf. ) of God, unaffected by man's weakness, because God's might will bring strength out of weakness. Also in the might of God's Spirit He appointed in the Church "first Apostles, then prophets and evangelists" 1 Corinthians 12:28, 'filling them with divine gifts and enriching them by the influx of His Spirit'.

Oracle of response (4:7–14)
While the task to build the temple falls mainly on Zerubabbel, the two leaders are both 'anointed ones' (verse 14; lit. "sons of oil", from the same root as 'messiah').

See also
 Lampstand
 Olive
 Zerubbabel
Related Bible parts: Haggai 1, Zechariah 1, Zechariah 2, Zechariah 3, Zechariah 5, Zechariah 6

Notes

References

Citations

Sources

External links

Jewish
Zechariah 4 Hebrew with Parallel English
Zechariah 4 Hebrew with Rashi's Commentary

Christian
Zechariah 4 English Translation with Parallel Latin Vulgate 

04